Crambus agitatellus, the double-banded grass-veneer moth,  is a moth of the family Crambidae. It is found in the eastern two-thirds of the United States and south-eastern Canada.

The wingspan is 17–22 mm. Adults are on wing from June to August.

The larvae feed on various grasses and other low-growing plants.

External links
Bug Guide
Images

Crambini
Moths described in 1860
Moths of North America